Bagenovia is a genus of Cambrian stenothecoid, presumed to be related to the molluscs, and known from various sites across Asia.

References

Prehistoric mollusc genera